Gare de Rochefort is a railway station serving the town Rochefort, Charente-Maritime department, southwestern France.

Services

The following train services serve the station as of January 2021:
intercity services (Intercités) Nantes - La Rochelle - Bordeaux
regional services (TER Nouvelle-Aquitaine) La Rochelle - Rochefort - Saintes - Bordeaux
local services (TER Nouvelle-Aquitaine) La Rochelle - Rochefort

References

Railway stations in Charente-Maritime
Railway stations in France opened in 1857
Gare